Brigadier William Nicholas White CB, DSO (10 September 1879 – 27 December 1951) was an English first-class cricketer. White was a right-handed batsman.

Pre-World War I career

White made his first-class debut for Hampshire against the Gentlemen of Philadelphia in 1903, where White made a duck in his only innings in the match.

After this White moved to Barbados, where he made his debut for Barbados against British Guiana in January 1904. From 1904 to 1906, White played six first-class matches for Barbados, with his final match coming in the final of the 1906 Inter-Colonial Tournament against Trinidad, which Barbados won by 16 runs. White was a losing finalist in the same competition in 1904. In his six matches for the Island, White scored 241 runs at a batting average of 21.90, with one half century which gave White his highest score for Barbados of 51.

In 1907, White returned to England and returned to playing for Hampshire. From 1907 to 1914, White played 60 further first-class matches for Hampshire, with his final first-class appearance coming against Warwickshire in 1941. In his 61 matches for Hampshire, White scored 2,827 runs at a batting average of 27.44, with 21 half centuries, two centuries and a career high score of 160* against Gloucestershire in 1909.

As well as representing Hampshire and Barbados, White also laid first-class cricket for the Marylebone Cricket Club, playing a single first-class match for the club in 1908 against Cambridge University. 

In 1910, White played a single first-class match for a combined Army and Navy side against a combined Oxford University and Cambridge Universities.

World War I service
White served in the First World War where he held the rank of Brigadier. During the course of the war White was awarded the Order of the Bath and the Distinguished Service Order.

Post-World War I
Following the end of the First World War, White played two matches for the Army in 1921 against Oxford University and the Royal Navy. White's final first-class match came for the Combined Services against Essex.

In his first-class career as a whole, White played 72 matches where he scored 3,225 at a batting average of 26.21 with 22 half centuries, two centuries and a high score of 160*. In the field White took 42 catches.

White played association football for the Army, captaining the Army in 1902 and 1902. White later became the Chairman of the Army Football Association.

White died at Poltimore, Devon on 27 December 1951. His son, Gilbert White, also reached the rank of brigadier in the British Army and played first-class cricket.

References

External links
William White at Cricinfo

1879 births
1951 deaths
Footballers from St Pancras, London
Cricketers from Greater London
English cricketers
Hampshire cricketers
Barbados cricketers
Northamptonshire cricketers
Marylebone Cricket Club cricketers
British Army cricketers
Combined Services cricketers
Royal Army Service Corps officers
British Army generals of World War I
Companions of the Distinguished Service Order
Companions of the Order of the Bath
English footballers
Army and Navy cricketers
Association footballers not categorized by position
Military personnel from London